Walter Adolph Hannemann (May 2, 1912 – April 29, 2001) was an American film editor. He was nominated for two Academy Awards in the category Best Film Editing for the films Two-Minute Warning and Smokey and the Bandit. Hannemann died in April 2001 of natural causes at his home in San Marcos, California, at the age of 88.

Seletced filmography 
 Two-Minute Warning (1976; co-nominated with Eve Newman)
 Smokey and the Bandit (1977; co-nominated with Angelo Ross)

References

External links 

1912 births
2001 deaths
People from Atlanta
American film editors
American television editors